Los Angeles Air Force Base (LAAFB) is a United States Space Force Base located in El Segundo, California.  Los Angeles Air Force Base houses and supports the headquarters of the United States Space Force's Space Systems Command (SSC), which was established on Aug. 13, 2021. The center manages research, development and acquisition of military space systems.

History 
Los Angeles Air Force Base traces its history back to the Air Research and Development Command's Western Development Division, which was activated on 1 July 1954 in Inglewood, not far from the current base.

In 1961 the Air Force developed a plan to consolidate its Space Systems Division and the Research and Development (R&D) Center of The Aerospace Corporation, which was created in 1960 to support Air Force space programs. The plan involved the acquisition of two pieces of real estate adjoining the R&D Center. An aircraft plant owned by the Navy, at the northwest corner of Aviation and El Segundo Boulevards, was transferred to the Air Force in October 1962. Another site, at the southwest corner of the same intersection, was owned by a mining company. The Aerospace Corporation purchased that property in November 1962, and between February 1963 and April 1964, it constructed its new headquarters there.  By April 10, 1964, the Air Force property at the intersection of Aviation and El Segundo Boulevards was designated as the Los Angeles Air Force Station, which was re-designated as the Los Angeles Air Force Base in September 1987.

In 2006 Area A of LAAFB was permanently closed after a deal with a local builder to exchange the land in Area A for the creation of the Schriever Space Complex in Area B and other new facilities. In February 2007, a new base exchange opened up in Area B.

The portion of Fort MacArthur remaining in military use is a sub-base of Los Angeles Air Force Base serving as a housing and administrative annex. Fort MacArthur is in the San Pedro district of Los Angeles, approximately twenty miles southeast of Los Angeles Air Force Base.

Role and operations
Los Angeles Air Force Base is headquarters to the Space and Missile Systems Center (SMC), a command of the United States Space Force. SMC is responsible for research, development, acquisition, on-orbit testing and sustainment of military space systems. In addition to managing Space Force space systems development, SMC participated in space programs conducted by other U.S. military services, government agencies and North Atlantic Treaty Organization (NATO) allies. SMC turns these systems over to the appropriate operating command.

61st Air Base Group
The 61st Air Base Group provides medical, civil engineering, communications, chaplain, security, logistics, personnel, readiness, and quality-of-life services to the Space and Missile Systems Center and other Department of Defense units in the Los Angeles basin. It consists of five squadrons and six staff agencies, totaling more than 790 personnel with $608 million in plant assets and an annual budget of $60 million.

Space and Missile Systems Center (SMC) 

The Space and Missile Systems Center (SMC) is a center that works in the areas involving military action in space and military space acquisition by the Department of Defense. In Summer 2021, the center was re-designated as Space Systems Command, one of the three major commands under the United States Space Force. It oversees the development, acquisition, launching, and sustaining of military space systems.

Global Positioning Systems Directorate
Formerly the Global Positioning Systems Wing, the Global Positioning Systems Directorate is a joint-service, multinational, civil/military systems directorate with more than 700 DoD/contractor personnel responsible for the development, launch and sustainment of the Global Positioning System. The directorate is responsible for the development and procurement of over 250,000 receiver systems and the United States' nuclear detonation detection system. Annual funding is $1 billion and the total program value is $32 billion.

Space Superiority Systems Directorate
Formerly the Space Superiority Systems Wing, the Space Superiority Systems Directorate is responsible for weapon systems development, fielding, and sustainment.

Launch Enterprise Directorate
The Launch Enterprise Directorate provides DoD and the National Reconnaissance Office with access to space through launch systems modernization, sustainment, and development of worldwide ranges for national security. The directorate conducts satellite mission integration and provides tools to test and support the nation's space launch, ballistic missile, and aeronautical testing.

MILSATCOM Systems Directorate
Formerly the Military Satellite Communications Systems Wing, the Military Satellite Communications Directorate (MILSATCOM) plans for, acquires, and sustains space-enabled global communications in support of the president, secretary of Defense and combat forces. MILSATCOM systems consists of satellites, terminals, and control stations, worth more than $42 billion providing communication for approximately 16,000 aircraft, ships, mobile, and fixed sites. As a jointly-manned directorate, it interfaces with major commands from each of the Armed Services, HQ Air Force and various DoD agencies.

Advanced Systems and Development Directorate 
The Advanced Systems and Development Directorate is an organization for systems and development planning for future Space capabilities.  Serves as primary provider of launch, spaceflight, hosted payloads and on-orbit operations for the entire DoD space research and development community.  Responsible for acquiring, integrating, launching, and operating R&D spacecraft, prototype operational systems, boosters, and ballistic missiles supporting national security objectives/missile defense programs. Co-located at LAAFB and Kirtland AFB, New Mexico.

Space Logistics Directorate  
Located at Peterson Space Force Base, Colorado, the Space Logistics Directorate has 550 people and a $500 million annual budget. It sustains and modifies worldwide USAF/DoD space weapon systems to include terrestrial and space weather, global positioning systems, launch range control, satellite command and control, secure communications, and missiles early warning. The directorate is the focal point for logistics, maintenance, supply, sustaining engineering and the Space Logistics Readiness Center.

Operationally Responsive Space Office  
The mission of the Operationally Responsive Space Office (ORS) is to plan and prepare for the rapid development of space capabilities.

Range and Network Division 
The Range and Network Division is responsible for modernizing and sustaining the world-wide Air Force Satellite Control Network as well as the nation's Launch and Test Range Systems located at Vandenberg SFB, California, and Cape Canaveral SFS, Florida.

Based units 
Notable units based at Los Angeles Air Force Base:

United States Space Force 
 61st Air Base Group
 61st Civil Engineering and Logistics Squadron
 61st Force Support Squadron
 61st Medical Squadron
 61st Security Forces Squadron
 Space and Missile Systems Center
 Advanced Systems and Development Directorate
 Global Positioning Systems Directorate
 Launch Enterprise Directorate
 MILSATCOM Systems Directorate
 Range and Network Division
 Remote Sensing Systems Directorate
 Space Superiority Systems Directorate

References

External links

 The Douglas Aircraft Plant That Became Los Angeles Air Force Base 
 Historical Overview of the Space and Missile Systems Center, 1954-2003

Installations of the United States Air Force in California
Military facilities in Greater Los Angeles
El Segundo, California
Buildings and structures in Los Angeles County, California